The men's doubles was a tennis event held as part of the Tennis at the 1920 Summer Olympics programme. It was the sixth appearance of the event. A total of 44 players (22 pairs) from 11 nations competed in the event, which was held from 16 to 24 August 1920 at the Beerschot Tennis Club. Nations were limited to four pairs (eight players) each. The event was won by Noel Turnbull and Max Woosnam of Great Britain, defeating Seiichiro Kashio and Ichiya Kumagae of Japan in the final. It was Great Britain's third victory in the men's doubles, most of any nation. Japan's silver came in its debut in the event. France earned its second consecutive bronze medal as Pierre Albarran and Max Decugis had a walkover in what would have been an all-France bronze-medal match.

Background

This was the sixth appearance of men's doubles tennis. The event has been held at every Summer Olympics where tennis has been on the program: from 1896 to 1924 and then from 1988 to the current program. A demonstration event was held in 1968.

As in previous Games, the field for this event was relatively weak and without top competitors. The Olympic tennis tournament was no longer scheduled adjacent to or concurrent with Wimbledon, as it had been in 1908 and 1912; however, it was at the same time as the U.S. Championship this year. Bill Tilden and Bill Johnston, and all the other American players, thus did not enter.

Belgium, Italy, Japan, Spain, and Switzerland each made their debut in the event. Great Britain made its fourth appearance in the event, tying the absent Germany for most among nations.

Competition format

The competition was a single-elimination tournament with a bronze-medal match. All matches were best-of-five sets. Tiebreaks had not been invented yet.

Schedule

Draw

Finals

Top half

Bottom half

References

Sources
 
 
  ITF, 2008 Olympic Tennis Event Media Guide

1920

Men's doubles
Men's events at the 1920 Summer Olympics